Yes Boss is a 1997 Indian Hindi-language romantic comedy film directed by Aziz Mirza starring Shah Rukh Khan, Juhi Chawla and Aditya Pancholi. Produced by Ratan Jain, it is based on the film For Love Or Money (1993) starring Michael J Fox.

At the 43rd Filmfare Awards, it received 6 nominations, including Best Actor (Khan), Best Actress (Chawla) and Best Villain (Pancholi), and won Best Male Playback Singer (Abhijeet Bhattacharya for "Main Koi Aisa Geet Gaoon")

Yes Boss partially inspired the Malayalam film Junior Senior (2005) and was remade in Tamil as Guru En Aalu (2009). The rights of the film are owned by Khan's production company Red Chillies Entertainment.

Plot 
Ambitious, Rahul Joshi wants to be rich, and is lucky enough to find a job with extra earnings from his boss, Siddharth, a lustful person having extramarital affairs, who has deviously trapped the rich Sheela. Rahul earns overtime money in keeping the affairs a secret. Later, Siddharth is lustfully attracted to the elegant and gorgeous Seema Kapoor, an aspiring model also desiring a life of luxury. Siddharth asks Rahul to help him trap Seema too. Helpless, Rahul does so, but also has a soft spot for her. Anyway due to his efforts, Seema is impressed by Siddharth's personality. Gradually, the two get closer; Seema begins liking Siddharth. However, she also grows close to Rahul while seeking his help.

As their companionship blossoms, Seema meets Rahul's mom, Sonali, a heart patient sensitive to any shocking news in life. Sheela's cousin Bhushan takes this benefit and tells Sonali that Rahul has married Seema, overjoying her. To not shock her, Rahul and Seema act as a happy couple and slowly fall in love. Siddharth learns about them, and offers Rahul his dream office, with unsaid implication that it was in return for Seema. Rahul realises he was supporting his lustful habits for his dream office by being a bootlicker to him. He says he wants only Seema.

After this fiasco, true love triumphs as Seema decides to spend her life with Rahul and Sonali, who wholeheartedly accepts their relationship again. Rahul decides he'd have a luxurious life for him and Seema by his own money, not by bootlicking anyone.

Cast 
Shahrukh Khan as Rahul Joshi
Juhi Chawla as Seema Kapoor
Aditya Pancholi as Siddharth Chaudhary
Kashmera Shah as Sheela Chaudhary
Kulbhushan Kharbanda as the father-in-law of Siddharth Chaudhary.
Gulshan Grover as Bhushan
Ashok Saraf as Johnny
Johnny Lever as Madhav Advani / Mr. Mad
Reema Lagoo as Mrs.Joshi, Rahul's mother.
Mahavir Shah as Advocate Shukla
Rakesh Bedi as Watchman at Girls hostel / Bahadur
Anant Mahadevan
Amrit Patel
Rahul Kanawat as Mahesh Joshi
Shashi Kiran
Sheela Sharma
Ajay Wadhavkar
Joginder Shelly

Music 

The film's soundtrack has 6 songs composed by Jatin–Lalit who also composed the background score, with lyrics by Javed Akhtar. Most of the songs are sung by Abhijeet Bhattacharya and won his first Filmfare Award for Best Male Playback Singer for the song "Main Koi Aisa Geet Gaoon". Other contributing artists are Kumar Sanu, Udit Narayan & Alka Yagnik. The song "Suniye To" is based on  "Ahla Ma Feki" by Hisham Abbas.

Box office 
It is the 12th-highest-grossing Indian film of 1997 worldwide.

India 
It opened on Friday, 18 July 1997, across 180 screens, and earned  nett on its opening day. It grossed  nett in its opening weekend, and had a first week of  nett. The film earned a total of  nett, and was declared "Hit" by Box Office India. It is the 14th-highest-grossing film of 1997 in India.

Overseas 
It earned $975,000 (3.48 crore) outside India. It is the 3rd-highest-grossing film of 1997 behind Dil To Pagal Hai ($3.3 million (12.04 crore)) and Pardes ($1.7 million (6.12 crore)), which were also Shah Rukh Khan starrers.

Awards 

 43rd Filmfare Awards:

Won

 Best Male Playback Singer – Abhijeet Bhattacharya for "Main Koi Aisa Geet Gaoon"

Nominated

 Best Actor – Shahrukh Khan
 Best Actress – Juhi Chawla
 Best Villain – Aditya Pancholi
 Best Music Director – Jatin–Lalit
 Best Lyricist – Javed Akhtar for "Chaand Taare"

References

External links 

1990s Hindi-language films
1997 films
Films scored by Jatin–Lalit
Hindi films remade in other languages
Films directed by Aziz Mirza